Binta Masi Garba (born 17 April 1967) is a Nigerian politician, businesswoman and  administrator, serving as the Senator of Adamawa North Senatorial District of Adamawa State since 2015. She served as Chairperson, Adamawa State chapter of All Progressives Congress and she is the first female State Chairperson of a registered major political party in Nigeria.

Binta served the Federal House of Representatives three times, from 1999 to 2011. She is the first politician to represent two different Federal in 2009, she was elected as the first Vice President of Commonwealth Women Parliamentarians (CWP) under Commonwealth Parliamentary Association (CPA) in Cameroon. She is the only female Senator-Elect in all the 19 Northern States of Nigeria in 2015 elections. She was also, the only female delegate from Adamawa State to the National Conference in Abuja.

Early life and education
Binta Masi Garba was born in Kaduna Army Barracks to a Muslim parents. Her parents are Higgi from Bazza, Michika Local Government Area of Adamawa State. Her father Mr Garba Tumba was an Army Officer. She is the second child, thus she was named Masi according to Higgi traditional naming convention. Between 1975 and 1981, she attended Army Children School, New Cantonment D, Hayin Banki, Kaduna. From there she proceeded for her Secondary School Education and obtained her (GCE/WAEC ‘O’ Level) in Government Day School, Kurmin Mashi, Kaduna South, Kaduna, between 1981 and 1987. She attended Kaduna Polytechnic and obtained Ordinary National Diploma (OND Marketing, 1990) and Higher National Diploma (HND Marketing, 1997). In 2004, she went to Harvard Kennedy School of Government - Harvard University (Public Financial Management). She holds two Diplomas in Theology from the Bible School of Church Growth and Practical Ministry, and Matthew Owujaye's Ministry, Kaduna. She is a recipient of an Honorary Doctorate Degree in Theology from Smith Christian University, Miami, Florida.

Political career
Binta Masi Garba started her political career in the year 1998 in Kaduna, Nigeria. Before that, she worked with the New Nigeria Newspapers as an advert officer, the year she was due for a promotion she was not given due to gender inequality. Binta Masi Garba always advocated for women rights; thus prompting her to take up the mandate to represent them in the Federal House of representative Kaduna South Federal Constituency. Not long from that gender inequality experience, she decides to venture into politics in 1998 in Kaduna South Federal Constituency, a place where the prevailing culture forbid women to be in public domain. Her first bid in 1998 was not successful. she contested again in 1999 for the office of Federal House of Representatives and won with  5,000 votes. She was the youngest Federal legislator in Nigeria in 1999. After her first successful tenure, she contested again in 2003 and won against her opponent with a margin of not less than 50,000.

In 2006, close to the end of her second term in the Federal House of Representatives, the then Governor of Adamawa State, Boni Haruna, having heard of her excellent performance as a legislator representing Kaduna South, entreated her to come back to her State of origin, Adamawa State, and contest. After making consultations, she consented and came down to contest for House of Representatives in Madagali/Michika Federal Constituency under PDP. She eventually won the seat and represented the constituency from 2007 to 2011. After the 2011 election a film, "“Dreams for Nigeria", was made by the International Republican Institute about leading female Nigerian politicians and Garba was one of the women chosen. The other women were Hon. Suleiman Oba Nimota, Adamawa State;  Hon. Saudatu Sani, Kaduna State;  Hon. Titi Akindahunsi, Ekiti State, Hon. Maimuna Adaji, Kwara State,  Hon. Florence Akinwale, Ekiti State and Hon. Beni Lar, Plateau State.

After her third consecutive tenure in the Federal House of Assembly, she re-contested and lost against Titsi Ganama.

The People's Democratic Party (PDP) under the Chairmanship of Bamanga Tukur had serious leadership crisis and a new faction emerged in 2013. The new faction of the PDP was under the Chairmanship of Abubakar Kawu Baraje. The new faction was called the new PDP (nPDP). Binta Masi Garba was appointed the Woman leader of the nPDP. She later joined All Progressives Congress (APC) alongside Governor Murtala Nyako and other Governors. She contested and emerged as the Chairman of the Adamawa State Chapter of APC. The victory at the poll made her the first female State Chairman of a registered major political party in Nigeria. The controversies surrounding the election of the Adamawa State Chapter of APC Executives election almost wrecked the party. Binta Masi Garba fought hard to unite the party in Adamawa state She oversaw one of the most successful party primaries in Adamawa State as a seating Chairman of the Adamawa State Chapter of APC. She was given a waiver to contest for the Senate seat in the party primaries and she eventually emerged victorious against her male contender. On 28 May 2015, she won the Senate seat of Adamawa North Senatorial District by winning in 3 local government areas of the 5 LGAs in the zone.

There were over 100 senators elected in the 8th National Assembly, but only six of these were women. The others were Monsurat Sunmonu from Oyo state, Stella Oduah and Uche Ekwunife who both represent Anambra, Fatimat Raji Rasaki, Oluremi Tinubu and Rose Okoji Oko.

Awards
Binta Masi Garba has won several awards, they include:

 Junior Chamber International The Outstanding Young Persons (TOYP) in Nigeria Award 2002
 PRS - The Women of Merit Gold Award;
 Prime International - Women in Leadership Merit Award May 2002
 Association of Market Women and Men, Abuja Role Model Award Sept 2002
 Dame Publication - Nigerian Women Award (Role Model) - 2002
 National Women Mobilization Committee Award - our Jewel (NAWOMCO)
 Leadership Distinction Award (Most Distinguished Representatives)
Valuable Contribution to Development of Parliamentary Democracy in Nigeria Award.
NCWS; Meritorious Award - 2016
Northern Youth Advocacy for Peace & Development
WAELE/ARCELFA Pride of African Woman Award  - 2016
National Lyrics & Singers Union Merit Award
Christian Association of Nigeria Youth Wing - 2016
Leadership Legislative Award (LLA) Senator of the year Adamawa State - 2016
Modibbo Adama University of Technology – Yola Award of Excellence - 2016
Northeast Star Magazine Media Merit Award Best Female Politician of the Year - 2017
Sheroes Foundation Outstanding leadership Award - 2017
Association of Female Medical Laboratory Scientists of Nigeria. Award of Recognition for selfless Service to Humanity - 2017

References

1967 births
Living people
Nigerian Muslims
20th-century Nigerian politicians
20th-century Nigerian women politicians
21st-century Nigerian politicians
21st-century Nigerian women politicians
Adamawa State politicians
Kaduna Polytechnic alumni
Harvard Kennedy School alumni
Members of the House of Representatives (Nigeria)
Members of the Senate (Nigeria)
People from Kaduna
Women members of the House of Representatives (Nigeria)
Women members of the Senate (Nigeria)